The Golis Mountains are a mountain range in Somaliland. Also known as Qar Golis, they cut through the Togdheer region, and end near the Gan Libah.

Jerato Pass 
This range has a mountain pass known as the "Jerrato Pass".

See also
Administrative divisions of Somaliland
Regions of Somaliland
Districts of Somaliland

References

External links
 

Mountain ranges
Mountain ranges of Africa
Mountain ranges of Somaliland
Togdheer